Old Dunstonian Association (ODA) is the alumni organisation for former pupils and staff of St Dunstan's College. The association sponsors a number of events for its members and several sports clubs which members can join. The Association and its constituent clubs are run by voluntary, unpaid Boards and Committees. The sports clubs each have their own separate membership and subscription arrangements. The ODA welcomes all former members of the St. Dunstan’s community to join us.

Old Dunstonian Sport LTD
Formal OD clubs exist for a number of different sports. Some like those for Rugby and Cricket are long-established with a regular fixture list and their own programmes of off-the-field events, others draw their members together to fulfil occasional fixtures.

The OD Clubhouse and Ground at Park Langley is home for these clubs and is run by a formal limited company, the OD Sports Club Limited. The company is responsible for running the Clubhouse and Ground and their finances, for the continuing maintenance and development of the facilities, and for appointing and supervising non-OD sports clubs to whom it grants licence arrangements for their use of the Clubhouse & Ground. Limited.

History

Notable Old Dunstonians
 Matthew d'Ancona, former editor of The Spectator and columnist for the Sunday Telegraph
 William Boon FRS, chemist
 Brian Brolly, showbusiness entrepreneur, and co-founder of the radio stations Jazz FM and Classic FM
 Sir William Castell LVO, Chairman of the Wellcome Trust and a Director of General Electric and BP
 The Rt Hon The Lord Drayson, PC, businessman, entrepreneur and former Defence Minister for Procurement
 Martin Evans, Nobel Prize winner for his work in the field of genetics
 Michael Geliot, opera and theatre director, former Director of Productions for Welsh National Opera
 Michael Grade, CBE, Baron Grade of Yarmouth,  Executive Chairman of ITV
 Hubert Gregg, broadcaster, writer, stage actor
 The Very Revd John Hall, Dean of Westminster
 The Rt Revd Dr David Jenkins, former Bishop of Durham
 Frederick Henry Johnson, VC, recipient of the Victoria Cross in the First World War
 Sir Paul Judge, business man
 Sir Stephen Laws KCB, QC, former First Parliamentary Counsel
 The Very Revd Ivan Neill, Chaplain General of the British Army and Provost of Sheffield
 Steve Nieve (né Steve Nason), musician, Elvis Costello and the Attractions
 Matt Salter, former captain of Bristol Rugby
 Robert Stanford Tuck, DSO, DFC, fighter pilot and test pilot
 Chuka Umunna, Liberal Democrat MP for Streatham
 Clifford Wilcock, OBE, engineer and politician
 Dave Gelly, OBE, musician, journalist, critic and author

References

External links 
 - St Dunstan's College

Alumni associations of academic institutions